Unai Emery Etxegoien (born 3 November 1971) is a Spanish football manager and former player who is the head coach of Premier League club Aston Villa.

After a career spent playing mostly in Spain's Segunda División, Emery transitioned into coaching after retiring in 2004. He began at Lorca Deportiva, where he achieved promotion to the Segunda División in his first season. He then joined Almería, whom he led to promotion to La Liga for the first time in the club's history. He subsequently moved to Valencia, leading the team to top-three finishes. After leaving Valencia, he coached Spartak Moscow for six months, before moving to Sevilla in 2013.

At Sevilla, Emery won an unprecedented three consecutive Europa Leagues, and moved to French club Paris Saint-Germain in 2016. There, he won a Ligue 1 title, two Coupe de France titles, two Coupe de la Ligues, and two Trophée des Champions, which included a domestic quadruple in his second season. After the expiry of his contract, Emery was appointed as head coach of English club Arsenal in 2018, succeeding Arsène Wenger. He finished Europa League runner-up in his first season, before being dismissed in November 2019 after a string of poor results. He was hired by Villarreal in July 2020, where he won the Europa League in his first season and guided the club to a Champions League semi-final run in the following season.

Early life and playing career
Emery was born in Hondarribia, Gipuzkoa, Basque Country. He is a native speaker of the Basque language. His father and grandfather, named Juan and Antonio respectively, were also footballers, both goalkeepers. The former appeared for several clubs in the second tier including Real Unión, while the latter competed with that club in the top division. Emery's uncle, Román, played as a midfielder. In July 2021, the Emery family completed a takeover of Real Unión, and his brother Igor became club president.

Emery, a left-sided midfielder, was a youth graduate of Real Sociedad, but never really broke into the first team (aged 24 he appeared in five La Liga games, scoring against Albacete Balompié in an 8–1 home win). After that, he resumed his career mostly in the Segunda División, amassing totals of 215 matches and nine goals over seven seasons. He retired with Lorca Deportiva CF at the age of 32, after one season in Segunda División B. In 2002, he signed for Burgos CF but was one of several players released before making a single competitive appearance due to lack of funds.

Coaching career

Lorca and Almería

Emery suffered a serious knee injury while at Lorca in the 2004–05 season, and he was offered the vacant coach's position by the club president. He immediately helped the club achieve promotion to the second division for the first time in its history, as well as beating top level side Málaga in the Copa del Rey. He was subsequently awarded the Miguel Muñoz Trophy as coach of the season. In his second season, the Murcians' first ever in the second division, the team finished fifth with 69 points, only five points off promotion to the top flight; they suffered relegation in 2007, after Emery's departure.

Emery then moved to Almería in division two, and again helped his squad overachieve: after guiding them to a first ever promotion in 2007, the Andalusian side finished eighth in La Liga in 2007–08. This prompted a move to Valencia, where he succeeded Ronald Koeman as coach.

Valencia
In 2008–09, his first season with Los Che, Emery led them to a sixth-place finish, with subsequent qualification to the UEFA Europa League, in spite of the club's serious financial problems. The team reached the Round of 32 in the UEFA Cup, losing on away goals after a 3–3 aggregate draw against Dynamo Kyiv, and the quarter-finals of the Copa del Rey, exiting against Sevilla.

In 2009–10, Emery led Valencia to third place, so the club returned to the UEFA Champions League after two years. After dropping down to Europa League (previously known as UEFA Cup), they lost in the quarter-finals to eventual winners Atlético Madrid on away goals, and exited in the round of 16 in the Copa del Rey against Deportivo La Coruña, losing 4–3 on aggregate. In May 2010, Emery renewed his contract for another year.

2010–11 started without David Villa and David Silva, sold to Barcelona and Manchester City respectively. Despite this, Valencia won five out of the first six league games (with one draw), starting the Champions League campaign with a 4–0 win in Turkey against Bursaspor, before being eliminated in the round of 16 by Schalke, and being knocked out in the same stage in the Copa del Rey by Villarreal. In the domestic league, the side finished third, thus again qualifying for the Champions League.

In 2011–12, Emery's side entered the Champions League and were paired with Chelsea, Bayer Leverkusen and Genk. They finished third in their group and subsequently entered the Europa League. Valencia lost in the semi-finals to eventual winners Atlético Madrid again. He left the club in June 2012, after again finishing third in 2011–12, ensuring Valencia's qualification for Champions League.

Spartak Moscow
On 13 May 2012, Leonid Fedun, owner of Spartak Moscow, announced Emery as the Russian club's coach for the following two seasons. On 25 November he was sacked after a run of poor results, after only managing the side for six months. His last game in charge was a 5–1 home loss in the derby against Dynamo Moscow.

Sevilla
Emery returned to Spanish football on 14 January 2013, replacing the sacked Míchel at the helm of Sevilla. He led the club to fifth position in 2013–14, his first full season. On 14 May 2014, he won the Europa League final, defeating Benfica on penalties.

After finishing the 2014–15 season in fifth place, one point behind former club Valencia, Emery again won the Europa League after defeating Dnipro Dnipropetrovsk, thus qualifying for the following Champions League. The victory meant that Sevilla became the most successful club in the history of the UEFA Cup/Europa League, with four wins, and Emery signed a one-year contract extension on 5 June 2015 which would have kept him at the club until 2017, after reported interest from West Ham United and Napoli.

In 2015–16, Emery led Sevilla to seventh position, having played the final games of the domestic league with several reserves and youth team players after the team confirmed their place in the Europa League final. This season, Sevilla entered the UEFA Champions League group stage as title holders of UEFA Europa League the previous season, they were third in the group and transferred to UEFA Europa League again. On 18 May 2016, despite trailing 1–0 at half-time, a goal from Kevin Gameiro and two from Coke resulted in a 3–1 victory over Liverpool at St. Jakob-Park in Basel.

On 12 June 2016, after Emery expressed his desire to leave Sevilla, the club announced that they would be parting ways.

Paris Saint-Germain
On 28 June 2016, Emery signed a two-year deal, with the option of a third, to succeed Laurent Blanc at French quadruple-holders Paris Saint-Germain. In his first competitive match in charge, on 6 August, his side beat Lyon 4–1 in Austria to lift the Trophée des Champions.

Emery led PSG to second place in their group of the Champions League, behind Arsenal. In the first knockout round they defeated Barcelona 4–0 at the Parc des Princes, only to historically lose 6–1 in Spain and subsequently be eliminated.

In the next Champions League season, PSG finished top of their group, in which Emery led them to a 3–0 win over Bayern Munich in the second match. However, they were knocked out in the round of 16, as they lost both legs by the eventual winner Real Madrid.

On 1 April, he picked up his second honour with les Rouge-et-Bleu with a 4–1 win over title rivals Monaco in the final of the Coupe de la Ligue. On 28 April 2018, Emery announced his decision to leave the Parisian club at the end of the season with a year left on his contract. He was replaced by German coach Thomas Tuchel at PSG following the conclusion of the 2017–18 season.

Arsenal

On 23 May 2018, Emery was appointed head coach of Arsenal. He agreed to a two-year deal, with the club having the option to extend his deal for a further year. 

In his first competitive game in charge, on 12 August, his side lost to Manchester City 2–0 in the Premier League. After a second consecutive loss to Chelsea on 18 August, Emery recorded his first win as Arsenal manager on 25 August, in a 3–1 home win over West Ham United. After this game, Arsenal won 11 games in a row, their best run of form since 2007. Arsenal then extended their unbeaten run to 22 games, including a 4–2 win over arch-rivals Tottenham Hotspur in Emery's first North London derby. Their 3–2 loss to Southampton in December was the first time they had been defeated in all competitions since August. However Arsenal capitulated towards the end of the season, only receiving 4 points in their last 5 league matches, effectively discarding any chance of qualifying for the Champions League through league position. Emery yet again reached a Europa League final, but was unsuccessful as Arsenal were beaten 4–1 by fellow English side Chelsea. Arsenal finished the season in fifth position, one place higher than the previous season, narrowly missing out on a Champions League spot. 

In the 2019 summer transfer window, Emery broke Arsenal's previous club record by signing Ivory Coast winger Nicolas Pépé. He also brought into the defence David Luiz from rivals Chelsea and Scotsman Kieran Tierney from Celtic, as well as midfielder Dani Ceballos on loan from Real Madrid.

On 29 November 2019, following a series of poor results and a winless run of seven games, Emery was sacked by Arsenal. His final game in charge was a 2–1 home defeat to Eintracht Frankfurt in the Europa League. He was replaced on an interim basis by Freddie Ljungberg and later on a permanent basis by Mikel Arteta.

Villarreal
On 23 July 2020, Emery was announced as the new head coach of La Liga club Villarreal, succeeding Javier Calleja on a three-year deal. On 23 December, he broke the club record of 18 matches unbeaten, after a 1–1 draw at home to Athletic Bilbao.

In May 2021, he led Villarreal to their first European final, after a 2–1 win on aggregate over his former club Arsenal in the semi-finals; he was the first ex-Gunners boss to beat his former team since George Graham in 1999. On 26 May, Villarreal won the Europa League final against Manchester United in Gdańsk, 11–10 on penalties after a 1–1 draw, to give him his fourth and a record win in the competition.

In November 2021, Emery was approached for the vacant managerial spot at Newcastle United following their Saudi-led takeover. He turned down the interest, saying that he was "100% committed" to Villarreal and that the English team had a "lack of a clear vision". In the 2021–22 UEFA Champions League, he led Villarreal to the semi-finals by beating Juventus and Bayern Munich, before being eliminated by eventual runners-up Liverpool.

Aston Villa 
On 24 October 2022, Emery was appointed as head coach of Aston Villa after the Premier League team paid a buyout fee of a reported €6 million (£5.2 million) to Villarreal. Due to work permit formalities, the appointment did not complete until 1 November. On 6 November, Emery won his first match in charge with a 3–1 win over Manchester United, Villa's first home Premier League victory against United since August 1995. His team were eliminated from the third round of the FA Cup 2–1 at home by EFL League Two team Stevenage on 8 January 2023, the seventh season a row where Villa failed to make it past the third round. He criticised the mentality of his players after the game.

Managerial statistics

Honours

Manager
Sevilla
UEFA Europa League: 2013–14, 2014–15, 2015–16

Paris Saint-Germain
Ligue 1: 2017–18
Coupe de France: 2016–17, 2017–18
Coupe de la Ligue: 2016–17, 2017–18
Trophée des Champions: 2016, 2017

Arsenal
UEFA Europa League runner-up: 2018–19

Villarreal
UEFA Europa League: 2020–21

Individual
Miguel Muñoz Trophy (Segunda División): 2005–06, 2006–07
La Liga Manager of the Month: March 2014, January 2015
European Coach of the Season: 2013–14
UNFP Manager of the Year: 2017–18
Globe Soccer Awards Coach Career Award: 2022

See also
List of UEFA Cup and Europa League winning managers

References

External links

1971 births
Living people
People from Hondarribia
Sportspeople from Gipuzkoa
Spanish footballers
Footballers from the Basque Country (autonomous community)
Association football midfielders
Real Sociedad B footballers
Real Sociedad footballers
CD Toledo players
Racing de Ferrol footballers
CD Leganés players
Lorca Deportiva CF footballers
Segunda División B players
La Liga players
Segunda División players
Spanish football managers
Lorca Deportiva CF managers
UD Almería managers
Valencia CF managers
FC Spartak Moscow managers
Sevilla FC managers
Paris Saint-Germain F.C. managers
Arsenal F.C. managers
Villarreal CF managers
Aston Villa F.C. managers
Segunda División B managers
Segunda División managers
La Liga managers
Russian Premier League managers
Ligue 1 managers
Premier League managers
UEFA Europa League winning managers
Spanish expatriate football managers
Spanish expatriate sportspeople in Russia
Spanish expatriate sportspeople in France
Spanish expatriate sportspeople in England
Expatriate football managers in Russia
Expatriate football managers in France
Expatriate football managers in England
Emery family
Spanish football chairmen and investors